Peltophorum is a genus of 5–15 species of flowering plants in the family Fabaceae, subfamily Caesalpinioideae. The genus is native to certain tropical regions across the world. The species are medium-sized to large trees growing up to 15–25 m tall, rarely 50 m.

Etymology 
Peltophorum literally means "shield-bearing": from Greek  ("peltē shield"), with the interfix , -phor(os) ("bearing") and New Latin suffix . 

It is a reference to the peltate (shield-like) form of the plant's stigma.

Species
, the following species were accepted by Plants of the World Online:
Peltophorum africanum Sond.
Peltophorum dasyrhachis (Miq.) Kurz
Peltophorum dubium (Spreng.) Taub.
Peltophorum grande Prain
Peltophorum pterocarpum (DC.) K.Heyne
Peltophorum racemosum Merr.
Peltophorum venezuelense L.Cardenas et al.

References

External links

 
Fabaceae genera
Caesalpinioideae